The village of Dehnawe Farza (Deh Now-ye Farzah) is the center of the Farza District, Kabul Province, Afghanistan.

See also 
Kabul Province

References

Populated places in Kabul Province